The mixed doubles tournament of the 2018 Badminton Asia Junior Championships was held from July 18 to 22. The defending champion of the last edition were Rehan Naufal Kusharjanto and Siti Fadia Silva Ramadhanti from Indonesia. Kusharjanto / Ramadhanti of Indonesia and Guo Xinwa / Liu Xuanxuan of China are the top 2 seeded this year.

Seeded

 Rehan Naufal Kusharjanto / Siti Fadia Silva Ramadhanti (quarterfinals)
 Guo Xinwa / Liu Xuanxuan (champions)
 Hiroki Midorikawa / Natsu Saito (third round)
 Chang Yee Jun / Pearly Tan Koong Le (third round)
 Liu Shiwen / Zhang Shuxian (third round)
 Wang Chan / Jeong Na-eun (final)
 Shang Yichen / Li Yijing (quarterfinals)
 Pramudya Kusumawardana / Ribka Sugiarto (quarterfinals)

Draw

Finals

Top half

Section 1

Section 2

Bottom half

Section 3

Section 4

References

External links 
Main Draw

Mixed
Asia Junior